A Small Noise is an unofficial compilation album by The Juliana Theory. Released by Tooth & Nail Records without approval from the band, it is not listed on their official website as part of their discography.

Track listing
 "Duane Joseph" – 3:59
 "For Evangeline" – 5:00
 "August in Bethany" – 4:19
 "Constellation" – 6:31
 "The Closest Thing" – 4:08
 "If I Told You This Was Killing Me, Would You Stop?" – 3:51
 "Into the Dark" – 4:03
 "To the Tune of 5,000 Screaming Children" – 3:51
 "Is Patience Still Waiting?" – 3:48
 "We're At the Top of the World" – 3:16
 "You Always Say Goodnight, Goodnight" – 9:30
 "This Is the End of Your Life" – 5:52
 "Breathing by Wires" – 6:22

References

2006 compilation albums
The Juliana Theory albums
Tooth & Nail Records compilation albums